Goran Bregović (born 22 March 1950) is a recording artist from Bosnia and Herzegovina. He is one of the most internationally known modern musicians and composers of the Slavic-speaking countries in the Balkans, and is one of the few former Yugoslav musicians who has performed at major international venues such as Carnegie Hall, Royal Albert Hall and L'Olympia.

A Sarajevo native, Bregović started out with Kodeksi and Jutro, but rose to prominence as the main creative mind and lead guitarist of Bijelo Dugme, widely considered one of the most popular and influential recording acts ever to exist in the Socialist Federal Republic of Yugoslavia. After Bijelo Dugme split up, he embarked on several critically and commercially successful projects, and started composing film scores. Among his better known film scores are three of Emir Kusturica's films (Time of the Gypsies, Arizona Dream and Underground). For Time of the Gypsies, Bregović won a Golden Arena Award at the Pula Film Festival in 1990, among other awards. He had also composed for the Academy Award-nominated film La Reine Margot and the Cannes-entered film The Serpent's Kiss.

Bregović, during his five-decade long career, has composed for critically acclaimed singers, including Sezen Aksu, Kayah, Iggy Pop, Šaban Bajramović, George Dalaras and Cesária Évora.

Early life
Born in Sarajevo, PR Bosnia-Herzegovina, FPR Yugoslavia to a Croatian father Franjo Bregović and Herzegovinian Serb mother Borka Perišić, Goran grew up with two younger siblings — sister Dajana and brother Predrag. Their father was from the Croatian region of Prigorje, specifically Sveti Petar Čvrstec village near Križevci, while their mother was born in Virovitica to parents that had shortly before her birth arrived in the nearby village of Čemernica, settling there from the village of Kazanci near Gacko in East Herzegovina. Goran's maternal grandfather fought in the Royal Serbian Army at the Salonica front during World War I and as a reward received land in Slavonia where he soon moved his family.

Goran's parents met shortly after World War II in Virovitica where his mother Borka lived and his father Franjo (who fought on the Partisan side during the war) attended a Yugoslav People's Army (JNA) military school. Franjo Bregović soon got his first job, teaching ballistics at a military school in Sarajevo, so the couple that at the time moved there. Goran, their first child, was born in 1950 in Sarajevo.

Goran was 10 years old when his parents divorced. In later interviews, he mentioned his father's alcoholism as the reason for the breakdown of their marriage. Soon after the split, his father moved to Livno, taking Goran's younger brother Predrag with him while Goran remained living with his mother in Sarajevo, visiting his father and brother every summer in Livno. Their father soon retired and eventually moved back to his home village in Zagorje while Goran's brother Predrag later moved back to Sarajevo for university studies.

Goran played violin in a music school. However, deemed untalented, he was thrown out during second grade. His musical education was thus reduced to what his friend taught him until Goran's mother bought him his first guitar in his early teens. Bregović wanted to enroll in a fine arts high school, but his aunt told his mother that it was supposedly full of homosexuals, which precipitated his mother's decision to send him to a technical (traffic) school. As a compromise for not getting his way, she allowed him to grow his hair long.

Early career
Upon entering high school, teenage Bregović joined the school band Izohipse where he began on bass guitar. Soon, however, he was kicked out of that school too (this time for misbehavior – he crashed into a school-owned Mercedes-Benz). Bregović then entered grammar school and its school band Beštije (again as a bass guitar player). When he was 16, his mother left him and moved to the coast, meaning that other than having a few relatives to rely on, he mostly had to take care of himself. He did that by playing folk music in a kafana in Konjic, working on construction sites, and selling newspapers.

Spotting him at a Beštije gig in 1969, Željko Bebek invited eighteen-year-old Bregović to play bass guitar in his band Kodeksi, which Goran gladly accepted.

Kodeksi

Eventually, Kodeksi shifted setup so Bregović moved from bass to lead guitar, resulting in Kodeksi having the following line-up during summer 1970: Goran Bregović, Željko Bebek, Zoran Redžić and Milić Vukašinović. All of them would eventually become members of Bijelo Dugme at some point in the future. At the time, they were largely influenced by Led Zeppelin and Black Sabbath. During the fall of 1970, this resulted in the departure of Željko Bebek, who (both as rhythm guitar player and singer) got phased out of the band. At the end of the year, Goran's mother and Zoran's brother arrived in Naples and took them back to Sarajevo.

Jutro

Then, in the autumn of 1971, Bregović enrolled at the University of Sarajevo's Faculty of Philosophy, studying philosophy and sociology. He soon quit, however. At the same time, Milić Vukašinović left for London, so Bregović formed a band with Nuno Arnautalić called Jutro (Morning), which Redžić soon joined as well. Over the next few years, the band changed lineups frequently, and on 1 January 1974 modified its name to Bijelo Dugme ("White Button").

Bijelo Dugme

From 1974 until 1989, Bregović played lead guitar and was the main creative force behind Bijelo Dugme (White Button). For years they stood as one of the most popular bands in SFR Yugoslavia. Just as with Jutro previously, he continued as Bijelo Dugme's undisputed leader and decision-maker as well as its public face in the Yugoslav print and electronic media once the band started taking off commercially.

Over the band's fifteen-year run, in addition to their enormous popularity at home, led by Bregović, Bijelo Dugme made several attempts at expanding their prominence outside of Yugoslavia. In late 1975, while recording their second album Šta bi dao da si na mom mjestu in London, they additionally recorded an English language track called "Playing the Part" (translated version of their Serbo-Croatian track "Šta bi dao da si na mom mjestu", itself an uncredited cover of Argent's 1972 track "I Am the Dance of Ages") that was packaged as a promo single for English music journalists. Never officially released for mass distribution, the track quickly fell into oblivion.

Bijelo Dugme had somewhat better luck with touring abroad, which almost entirely took place in the Eastern Bloc countries as part of their respective cultural exchange programs with SFR Yugoslavia. The band briefly toured the Polish People's Republic during April 1977, a 9-concert leg as part of the tour in support of their third album Eto! Baš hoću!. During their 10-day Polish tour, the band played two concerts on back-to-back nights in Warsaw, followed by Olsztyn, Zielona Góra, three shows on back-to-back days in Poznań, and finally two shows on the same day in Kalisz. While in Poland, they also shot a 30-minute television special for TVP3 Katowice, a regional Katowice-based branch of the state-owned Telewizja Polska. Later that year, following the tour that culminated in a triumphant open-air concert at Hajdučka Česma in Belgrade, Bregović went to serve his mandatory Yugoslav People's Army (JNA) stint. Assigned to a unit based in Niš, the twenty-seven-year-old reported for service on 3 November 1977 and would spend the following year away from music, a period during which the band was also on hiatus.

During early 1982, the band played in Innsbruck, Austria as representatives of the city of Sarajevo and SFR Yugoslavia, the site of the upcoming Winter Olympics, as part of an event bringing together past and future Winter Olympic hosts. On return to Yugoslavia from Innsbruck, the band had its equipment confiscated by the Yugoslav customs after undeclared musical equipment was found among their luggage. Some six months after that, during summer 1982, Bijelo Dugme went on a tour of the People's Republic of Bulgaria, playing 41 shows throughout the country from 15 July until 31 August 1982. Despite the tour in support of their latest studio album Doživjeti stotu being over for more than a year, and having no new material to promote, the band reportedly accepted the tour of Bulgaria in order to recover some of the funds lost after getting fined by the Yugoslav customs over the attempt to bring undeclared musical equipment into the country.

In summer 1985, following a decade of continuous rejection for tours of the Soviet Union by the cultural attaché of the Soviet embassy in Yugoslavia, Bijelo Dugme was finally approved and booked to play in Moscow on 28 July 1985 on the same bill with fellow Yugoslav rock act Bajaga i Instruktori at a huge open-air concert at Gorky Park as part of the 12th World Festival of Youth and Students. Ahead of the show, Bregović decided to sequester the band in Budva for two weeks in order to practice for the Moscow show, an indication of the seriousness with which they approached this particular concert. However, once in Moscow, due to overcrowding at Gorky Park and resulting safety concerns, the event got interrupted around 10 p.m. after the Bajaga i Instruktori set before Bijelo Dugme even had a chance to take the stage. Two days later on 30 July 1985, instead at the marquee Gorky Park in central Moscow, Bijelo Dugme got to play the Dynamo Arena on the city outskirts at an unpopular noon-hour time slot.

Guest appearances, collaborations and business venture
In between Bijelo Dugme's studio releases and tours, in-demand Bregović worked on various side projects in Yugoslavia. These included releasing a solo record in 1976 and composing two movie soundtracks—1977's Leptirov oblak and 1979's Lične stvari.

He also tried his hand at music production, producing Idoli's 1980 seven-inch single "Maljčiki" / "Retko te viđam sa devojkama" and co-producing, alongside Kornelije Kovač, Zdravko Čolić's fourth studio album Malo pojačaj radio in 1981.

Bregović furthermore made guest appearances on guitar on various studio recordings by different Yugoslav pop, folk, and rock acts: Neda Ukraden's track "Tri djevojke" (together with Bijelo Dugme bandmates Vlado Pravdić and Zoran Redžić) off her 1976 album Ko me to od nekud doziva, Hanka Paldum's track "Zbog tebe" off her 1980 album Čežnja, "Ne da/ne nego i/ili" track by Kozmetika off their 1983 eponymous album, Valentino's track "Pazi na ritam" off their 1983 debut album ValentiNo1, Riblja Čorba's track "Disko mišić" off their 1985 album Istina, Merlin's 1986 album Teško meni sa tobom (a još teže bez tebe), Mjesečari track "Gdje izlaziš ovih dana" off their 1988 album One šetaju od 1 do 2, and Piloti track "Tiho, tiho" off their 1990 album Nek te Bog čuva za mene.

During his time leading Bijelo Dugme, Bregović also became involved in the financial and organizational side of the music business. In 1984, dissatisfied with their respective financial terms at the state-owned Jugoton label, Bijelo Dugme bandleader Bregović and one of Yugoslavia's biggest pop stars Zdravko Čolić got together to establish their own music label Kamarad, which—via a deal with state-owned Diskoton and later another newly-established private label Komuna—would end up co-releasing all of Bijelo Dugme's subsequent studio albums including three of Čolić's studio albums from 1984 until 1990. Considered an unusual move at the time in a communist country with nearly across-the-board public ownership that had just recently began allowing certain modes of private entrepreneurship, starting a privately-owned record label—combined with Bregović's and Čolić's high public profile in Yugoslavia—got them both a lot of additional attention in the country's press. The company was registered in Radomlje near Domžale in SR Slovenia. Due to not having its own production facilities and distribution network, the new label entered into a co-releasing agreement with Diskoton thus essentially functioning as the legal entity that holds the licensing rights to the works of Bijelo Dugme and Zdravko Čolić. Kamarad's debut co-release was Čolić's 1984 studio album Ti si mi u krvi followed by Bijelo Dugme's self-titled studio album later that year with new vocalist Mladen "Tifa" Vojičić. The label would also co-release many of Dugme's and Čolić's later 'best of' compilations in addition to Bregović's movie soundtrack albums as well as Vesna Zmijanac's 1992 album Ako me umiriš sad.

Solo career

During the late 1980s, a period that would turn out to be the final years of Bijelo Dugme, Bregović entered the world of film music. His first project was Emir Kusturica's Time of the Gypsies (1989) and it turned out to be a great success (both the film and the soundtrack). Bregović's collaboration with Kusturica continued as the musician composed the soundtrack (which was performed by Iggy Pop) for Kusturica's next film Arizona Dream (1993). During the Bosnian War, Bregović relocated to Paris, but also lived in Belgrade. His next major project, music for Patrice Chéreau's Queen Margot was a great success as well, and as a result, the film won two awards on the 1994 Cannes Film Festival. The next year's Golden Palm award went to Underground, for which Goran Bregović composed the music.

In 1997, he worked with Turkish singer Sezen Aksu on her album Düğün ve Cenaze (Wedding and Funeral). After that album, he continued making composite albums with other musicians that were based on his music and singers' lyrics.

He made an album with George Dalaras in 1999 named Thessaloniki – Yannena with Two Canvas Shoes. In the same year, Bregović recorded an album called Kayah i Bregović (Kayah and Bregović) with popular Polish singer Kayah which sold over 700,000 copies in Poland (seven times platinum record).

In 2001, he recorded another album with another Polish singer, Krzysztof Krawczyk, titled "Daj mi drugie życie" ("Give Me Second Life").

In 2005, Bregović took part in three large farewell concerts of Bijelo Dugme.

A number of works created by Bregović can be heard on the soundtrack to the 2006 film Borat: Cultural Learnings of America for Make Benefit Glorious Nation of Kazakhstan, most notably "Đurđevdan". The film itself actually features more Bregović samples than the soundtrack.

Two musical numbers by Bregović, "Ne Siam Kurve Tuke Sijam Prostitutke," and "Gas, Gas" were featured in the soundtrack of the 2012 Brazilian telenovela, Salve Jorge, on the television network Rede Globo.

Wedding and Funeral Orchestra

For many years Bregović performed with a large ensemble of musicians: a brass band, bagpipes, a string ensemble, a tuxedo-clad all-male choir from Belgrade, women wearing traditional Bulgarian costumes, and Roma singers make up his 40-piece band and orchestra.

Since 1998, and until about 2012, Bregović has been performing his music mainly in the form of concerts all over the world with his Wedding and Funeral Orchestra. This consists of 10 people (in the small version) or 37 (in the large version, although, in some instances, this number varies, depending on participants from the host country).

Since 2012 the orchestra consists of 9 people (in the small version) or 19 (in the large version), as it played in New York at the Lincoln Center on 15 and 16 July 2016.

The small orchestra consists of Muharem "Muki" Rexhepi (vocals, drums), Bokan Stanković (first trumpet), Dragić Velićović (second trumpet), Stojan Dimov (sax, clarinet), Aleksandar Rajković (first trombone, glockenspiel), Miloš Mihajlović (second trombone), female vocals Bulgarian singers Daniela Radkova-Aleksandrova and Ljudmila Radkova-Trajkova, and Goran himself. 
The large orchestra includes also string quartet: Ivana Mateijć (first violin), Bojana Jovanović-Jotić (second violin), Saša Mirković (viola), and Tatjana Jovanović-Mirković, as well as sextet of male voices: Dejan Pesić (first tenor), Milan Panić and Ranko Jović (second tenors), Aleksandar Novaković (baritone), Dušan Ljubinković and Siniša Dutina (basses).

In previous years, in the orchestra the following musicians have performed: Ogi Radivojević and Alen Ademović (vocals, drums), Dalibor Lukić (second trumpet), Dejan Manigodić (tuba), Vaska Jankovska (vocals).

In 2013, as part of his Asia-Pacific tour (including Australia, New Zealand, and Hong Kong), Bregović performed with a string quartet, a male choir, Bulgarian singers and half of a brass band. The other part of the brass band – including bass and percussions – were being played from his computer. In 2017, he was a guest artist on Puerto Rican rapper Residente's album Residente on the song "El Futuro Es Nuestro" (Spanish for "The Future is Ours").

Eurovision
During the Eurovision 2008 final in Belgrade Arena, Serbia, he played as the interval act. He also composed the Serbian entry for the Eurovision Song Contest 2010; 'Ovo Je Balkan' sung by Milan Stanković.

Musical style
Bregović's compositions, extending Balkan musical inspirations to innovative extremes, draw upon European classicism and Balkan rhythms.

Bregović's music carries: Yugoslav, Bulgarian, Romani, Greek, Romanian, Albanian, Italian, Turkish and Polish themes and is a fusion of popular music, with traditional polyphonic music from the Balkans, tango and brass bands.

Personal life
During the early 1970s, Bregović's first child, daughter Željka, was born out of wedlock from a brief relationship with a Sarajevo-based dancer named Jasenka. Željka lives in Austria where she gave birth to Goran's granddaughter, Bianca.

With Bijelo Dugme's mid-1970s breakout commercial success and Bregović's increased public profile in Yugoslavia, details of his lifestyle and romantic relationships also became fodder for the country's press. Throughout the late 1970s and early 1980s, various Yugoslav print media outlets documented his high-profile relationship with Serbian model Ljiljana Tica who reportedly inspired his song "Bitanga i princeza" off Bijelo Dugme's eponymous 1979 album.

In 1993, Bregović married his long-time girlfriend Dženana Sudžuka, a Bosniak model. The wedding ceremony held in Paris featured film director Emir Kusturica as the groom's best man and longtime Bijelo Dugme backing vocal Amila Sulejmanović as the bride's maid of honour.

The couple has three daughters: Ema (born in March 1995), Una (February 2002), and Lulu (May 2004).

On 12 June 2008, fifty-eight-year-old Bregović sustained a spinal injury in Belgrade, breaking vertebrae by falling four meters from a cherry tree in the garden of his Senjak home. After being assessed by doctors, his condition was stated to be "stable without neurological complications." Following surgery, he made a quick recovery and, within a month on 8 and 9 July, held two big concerts in New York City, proving for more than two hours each night his performance skills had not suffered from the accident.

Bregović's siblings, brother Predrag and sister Dajana, live in New York City and Split, respectively.

Real estate
Bregović owns real estate all over the world, but divides most of his time between Belgrade where he does most of his musical recording work and Paris where his spouse lives with their three daughters. 

He reportedly owns properties in Paris, Istanbul, Belgrade, Zagreb, on Mount Jahorina, and Perast, many of which are used for commercial purposes such as touristic rentals, studio recording, and filming locations. 

In Belgrade, Bregović owns multiple properties in the upscale Senjak neighbourhood.

Political views

In 1971, twenty-one-year-old Bregović—a student at the University of Sarajevo's Faculty of Philosophy—got accepted into the Yugoslav Communist League (SKJ), the only party in SFR Yugoslavia's political system.

Throughout the mid-to-late 1970s, by now a famous rock musician in SFR Yugoslavia, Bregović often publicly expressed personal support for the communist ideology while underscoring importance of being active in the party.

In 1990—with the dissolution of the SKJ and reinstatement of multi-party political system in Yugoslavia—Bregović expressed public support for Ante Marković's Union of Reform Forces of Yugoslavia (SRSJ), a centre-left social-democrat political party opposing ethnic nationalism and advocating for reform of Yugoslav communism into liberal market capitalism. Furthermore, he actively participated in the party's election campaign ahead of the general elections in the SR Bosnia and Herzegovina constituent unit of SFR Yugoslavia, lending his celebrity and contributing to the campaign in creative capacity. Despite securing public support, endorsements, and even active campaign participation from many prominent public figures in SR Bosnia and Herzegovina such as Emir Kusturica, Nele Karajlić, Branko Đurić, etc., the party got only 8.9% of the total vote.

On 2 April 1999—a week into the NATO bombing of Yugoslavia—alongside Greek performers George Dalaras, Stavros Kouyioumtzis, and Alkistis Protopsalti as well as a number of others from different parts of the Balkans, Bregović played at an anti-war open-air concert at Thessaloniki's Aristotelous Square.

In the years following the Yugoslav Wars and breakup of Yugoslavia, Bregović has described himself as Yugonostalgic. In 2009, he stated: "Yugoslavia is the intersection of so many worlds: Orthodox, Catholic, Muslim. With music, I don't have to represent anyone, except myself – because I speak the first language of the world, the one everyone understands: music."

Controversy
Bregović has frequently been accused of plagiarizing other performers' works as well as republishing his own previously released material as new.

Enrico Macias plagiarism lawsuit
In the mid-2000s, French singer-songwriter Enrico Macias reportedly sued Bregović over Bregović's song "In the Deathcar" off the Arizona Dream soundtrack album, claiming it plagiarized Macias' song "Solenzara". Media outlets in the Balkans reported in 2015 that the French court ruled in Macias' favour, ordering Bregović to pay Macias €1 million in damages.

In response, via a press release distributed to media outlets throughout the Balkans, Bregović's representative Svetlana Strunić claimed that there never was a plagiarism court process against Bregović in France.

2015 denial of entry into Poland
In March 2015, Bregović performed in a concert in Crimea, which was annexed by Russia the previous year. The following month, the Life Festival in Oświęcim, Poland canceled an appearance by Bregović, saying that his statements were "contrary to the values cherished by the Life Festival founders."

List of film scores

1977 – Butterfly cloud (Leptirov oblak) – Directed by: Zdravko Randić
1979 – Personal Affairs (Lične stvari) – Directed by: Aleksandar Mandić
1988 – Time of the Gypsies (Dom za vešanje) – Directed by: Emir Kusturica
1989 – Kuduz – Directed by: Ademir Kenović
1990 – Silent Gunpowder (Gluvi barut) – Directed by: Bahrudin Čengić
1991 –  (Das Serbische Mädchen) – Directed by: 
1991 – The Little One (Mala) – Directed by: Predrag Antonijević
1991 – Čaruga – Directed by: Rajko Grlić
1993 – Arizona Dream – Directed by: Emir Kusturica
1993 – Toxic Affair – Directed by: Philoméne Esposito
1993 – La Nuit sacrée – Directed by: Nicolas Klotz
1993 – Le Nombril du monde – Directed by: Ariel Zeitoun
1993 – KIKA – Directed by: Pedro Almodóvar
1994 – soundtrack for La Reine Margot – Directed by: Patrice Chéreau
1995 – Underground – Directed by: Emir Kusturica
1997 – Music for Weddings and Funerals (Musik för bröllop och begravningar) – Directed by: Unni Straume
1997 – A Chef in Love (Shekvarebuli kulinaris ataserti retsepti) – Directed by: Nana Djordjadze
1997 – The Serpent's Kiss – Directed by: Philippe Rousselot
1997 – XXL – Directed by: Ariel Zeitoun
1998 – Train de Vie – Directed by: Radu Mihaileanu
1999 – The Lost Son – Directed by: Chris Menges
1999 – Tuvalu – Directed by: Veit Helmer
1999 – Operation Simoom (Operacja Samum) – Directed by Władysław Pasikowski
2000 – 27 Missing Kisses – Directed by: Nana Djordjadze
2000 – Je li jasno prijatelju? – Directed by: Dejan Ačimović
2005 – The Turkish Gambit (Турецкий гамбит) – Directed by: Dzhanik Faiziyev
2005 – I giorni dell'abbandono – Directed by: Roberto Faenza
2006 – Karaula – Directed by: Rajko Grlić (This is not true)
2006 – Le Lièvre de Vatanen – Directed by: Marc Rivière
2006 – Borat: Cultural Learnings of America for Make Benefit Glorious Nation of Kazakhstan (non-original music; "Ederlezi" from Dom za vešanje)
2007 – Fly by Rossinant – Directed by: Jacky Stoév
2008 – Mustafa – Directed by: Can Dündar
2011 – Baikonur – Directed by Veit Helmer

Discography

With Bijelo dugme

Original movies soundtracks
Not all his soundtracks compositions are commercially available.
1988: Time of the Gypsies (Kamarad, Diskoton, PolyGram, Komuna)
1989: Kuduz (Diskoton)
1993: Toxic affair (Polygram / Universal)
1993: Arizona Dream (Kamarad, PolyGram, Komuna)
1994: La Reine Margot (Kamarad, PolyGram, Komuna)
1995: Underground (Kamarad, PolyGram, Komuna)
1995: A Chef in Love (Kamarad)
2000: Tuvalu avec Jürgen Knieper (United One Records)
2005: I giorni dell'abbandono with Carmen Consoli
2006: Le Lièvre de Vatanen (PolyGram)
2008: Mustafa (Sony Music Entertainment)

Compilations
His compilations include soundtracks from different works.
1996: PS (Komuna)
1998: Ederlezi (PolyGram)
1999: Magic book (Bravo Records)
2000: Songbook (Mercury Records, Universal)
2000: Music for films (PolyGram)
2009: Welcome to Bregović (Wrasse Records)

Other albums
1976: Goran Bregović (PGP RTB)
1991: Paradehtika with Alkistis Protopsalti (Polydor)
1997: Düğün ve Cenaze with Sezen Aksu (Raks Müzik)
1997: Thessaloniki – Yannena with Two Canvas Shoes with George Dalaras (Minos-EMI)
1998: Silence of the Balkans, live in Thessaloniki (Mercury Records)
1999: Kayah & Bregović with Kayah (ZIC-ZAC)
2000: Balkanica with Athens Symphony Orchestra (FM Records)
2001: Krawczyk & Bregović Daj mi drugie życie with Krzysztof Krawczyk (BMG Poland, Rada)
2002: Tales and Songs from Weddings and Funerals (Mercury)
2007: Goran Bregović's Karmen with a Happy End (Mercury)
2009: Alkohol: Šljivovica & Champagne (Kamarad, Mercury)
2012: Ederlezi x Four (FM Records)
2012: Champagne for Gypsies (Kamarad, Mercury)
2017: Three Letters from Sarajevo, Opus 1 (Wrasse Records)

Guest performances 
2017: "El Futuro Es Nuestro" (Residente), by Residente

Honours and awards
On 31 June 2006, he received a copy of the key of the city of Tirana by Edi Rama on the occasion of his visit to Albania.
In 2021, he was awarded the Order of Karađorđe's Star by President Aleksandar Vučić on the occasion of Statehood Day of Serbia.

Annotations

References

Further reading

Marković, Aleksandra. "Goran Bregović, the Balkan Music Composer." Ethnologia Balkanica 12 (2008): 9–23.

External links

 
 

1950 births
Living people
Musicians from Sarajevo
Yugoslav musicians
Bosnia and Herzegovina rock musicians
Bosnia and Herzegovina people of Croatian descent
Bosnia and Herzegovina people of Serbian descent
Bosnia and Herzegovina expatriates in France
Bosnia and Herzegovina guitarists
Bosnia and Herzegovina male guitarists
20th-century guitarists
21st-century guitarists
Golden Arena winners
World Music Awards winners
Indexi Award winners
20th-century male musicians
21st-century male musicians